Maurice Philippe (30 April 1932 – 5 June 1989), also known as Maurice Phillippe, was a British aircraft and Formula One car designer.  

Philippe designed his first car in 1955, called the MPS (Maurice Philippe Special), while employed developing the Comet 4 aircraft for De Havilland.

Philippe raced a Lotus 7 in 1963 and 1964, and in 1965 was asked by Colin Chapman to be his "design team" at Team Lotus.  Philippe and Chapman first redesigned the Lotus 39, then produced the Lotus 43, the classic Lotus 49, the ground-breaking Lotus 72 as well as the Lotus 56 turbine Indy cars. 

In 1978, he replaced Derek Gardner as chief designer at Tyrrell, with the Tyrrell 008 finishing fourth in the Constructors' Championship. The 1979 Tyrrell 009 ground-effect car was less successful, only scoring four third places.  In 1980, the Tyrrell 010 was introduced and was raced in modified form until 1981. 

In 1988, he designed the March-Alfa 89CE Indy car, but he died in 1989 before the car ran for the first time.

References

External links
 Biography at www.grandprix.com

Formula One designers
1932 births
1989 deaths
Lotus Cars
British motorsport people